Doodhpathri (translation: Valley of Milk) is a tourist destination and a hill station in the Indian administered union territory of Jammu and Kashmir. It is located in Khan Sahib area of Budgam district of Jammu and Kashmir.

History and Etymology 
The name "doodhpathri" means Valley of Milk. It is said that the famous saint of Kashmir Sheikh ul Aalam Sheikh Noor din Noorani has prayed here and once when he was in search of water in the meadows, to offer prayers, he pricked the ground with his stick to search for water and milk came out. He asked the milk that you can only be used for drinking and not performing ablution. Hearing this milk at once changed its state to water and the meadow got its name Doodhpathri. The water which is at present flowing through the meadows has a milky appearance from the distance and remains very cold throughout the year. The lush green grasses over the vast meadows and silver shining streams running over the large stones further increase its beauty. Doodhpathri is sloping grassy landscapes with a diversity of multicolored flowers up to Chang. The famous Tosamaidan lies in the west of Doodpathri.

Geography 
Doodhpathri lies in a bowl shaped valley in the Pir Panjal Range of the Himalayas, at an altitude of 2,730 m (8,957 ft) above sea level. It is an alpine valley covered with snow clad mountains and the meadows of Pine Fir and Deodar. The natural meadows, which are covered with snow in winter, allow the growth of wild flowers such as daisies, forget-me-nots and butter cups during spring and summer.

Demographics 
Doodhpathri has no permanent settlement and is inaccessible during winter due to heavy snowfall. In summer shepherds from the plains of district Budgam bring cattle for grazing and  remain at Doodhpathri seasonally for about six months.

Access 
Doodhpathri is easily accessible from Srinagar or Srinagar Airport (SXR), in under 2–3 hours from car or bus. The routes of doodhpathri are from Srinagar to Budgam, Budgam to Ichgam, Ichgam to Khansahib, and Khansahib to Doodhpathri via Raiyar.

By road
Doodhpathri is easily accessible from Srinagar in under 1 and Half Hour from car or Taxi.

By air
The nearest airport is the Sheikh ul-Alam International Airport (Srinagar, Jammu and Kashmir). Doodhpathri is at a distance of 40 km From this Airport and it takes about 1 hour by Car.

Places around Doodhpathri 
Main attraction of Doodhpathri is Tangnar, Mujpather, Dophkhal, Sochilpather, Palmaidan and Parihas.

 Tangnarٹنٚگٕہ نار: (Lit; Gorge Of Pears) This place comes on the way  before doodpathri,it is a beautiful place of small valleys with deaodar and pine trees on small hills.
 Mujpathriمُجِہ پَتھٕر: Mujpathri (translation:Valley of Turnip) is a small hamlet  from doodpathri, it is situated on the bank of river shaliganga.
 Palmaidanپَلۂ مآٔدآن : Palmaidan (translation:Big stones ground) the name of this place is after the "Big Stones" because there are huge stones all around the ground. It is beautiful place with a small stream running on one side of the ground. The place is rich in deodar and pine trees.
Diskhal ڈِسکُھل: Dikshal is a beautiful meadow on the top of the mountain and overlooks the Ashtaar glacier. It is around  trek from Shaliganga Nallah in Dodhpathri.

References

<ref>https://www.myfeeling.in/2021/12/httpswww.myfeeling.in202112doodhphatri-kashmir_0453203935.html}

Budgam district
Hill stations in Jammu and Kashmir